Rozhkovo is a rural locality (a village) in Filippovskoye Rural Settlement, Kirzhachsky District, Vladimir Oblast, Russia. The population was 12 as of 2010. There are 2 streets.

Geography 
Rozhkovo is located on the Melyozha River, 26 km southwest of Kirzhach (the district's administrative centre) by road. Zakharovo is the nearest rural locality.

References 

Rural localities in Kirzhachsky District